Metachanda reunionella is a moth species in the oecophorine tribe Metachandini. It was described by Pierre Viette in 1957.

References

Oecophorinae
Moths described in 1957
Taxa named by Pierre Viette